Norm Hall (May 14, 1926 – March 11, 1992), was an American racecar driver.

Born in San Francisco, California, Hall died in Pittsboro, Indiana.  He drove in the USAC Championship Car series, racing in the 1961, 1964, and 1965 seasons, with 17 career starts, including the Indianapolis 500 races in 1961 and 1964.  He finished in the top ten 8 times, with his best finish in 5th position twice in 1965, both at Trenton.
Known as the "Gentleman Racer" for his uncharacteristic class, he was far and above the usual coarse breed of American racers. 
Norm had the only 110 Offy midget built by A. J. Watson.
Norm's dad was Burt Hall. One of the original seven members of the  "Lafayette Escadrille" squadron in WWl.

1926 births
1992 deaths
Indianapolis 500 drivers
Racing drivers from San Francisco